Daniel Joseph Mitchell Janner  (born 27 April 1957) is a British King's Counsel, specialising in criminal law. He is the founder of the FAIR (Falsely Accused Individuals for Reform) campaign, through which he has played a key role in pushing for legislation to give anonymity to those accused of sex offences.

Early life 
He is the son of Greville Janner, former Labour MP, member of the House of Lords and co-founder of the Holocaust Educational Trust, and the grandson of the Labour MP and peer Barnett Janner.

Education 
Janner was educated at University College School and Trinity Hall, Cambridge (the same alma mater as his father), where he won the Dr Cooper's Law Studentship in 1979 and graduated with an MA (Cantab.) in the subject. He was the President of the Cambridge Union Society and is now on its Board of Trustees.

Career 
Janner was called to the Bar in 1980 (Middle Temple) and took Silk in 2002. He is known for his legal work on the Heysel Stadium disaster, the Knightsbridge Security Deposit robbery, and his work with Cliff Richard and Paul Gambaccini on the FAIR campaign, launching a petition which received over 27,000 signatures and received an official response from Parliament.

Politics
In 1983 Janner was the Labour parliamentary candidate for Bosworth, where a combination of adverse boundary changes – most notably the removal of the Labour-leaning town of Coalville from the constituency – and the existence of a Social Democratic Party (SDP) candidate conspired to leave him in third place with only 19.5 per cent of the vote. Janner's politics then moved rightward with alacrity: having abandoned Labour for the SDP in 1985, within a year he had joined the Conservative Party, dismissing his short-lived Social Democratic affiliation as a "waste of time" and declaring that his new party was the only place to effectively fight the advance of the Militant tendency. From 1996 to 1999 he was the Director of Research for the Society of Conservative Lawyers.

Personal life 
Janner is married with 3 children.

References 

Living people
1957 births
English barristers
Daniel
Alumni of Trinity Hall, Cambridge
Presidents of the Cambridge Union
Sons of life peers
English King's Counsel